The obturator foramen (Latin foramen obturatum) is the large opening created by the ischium and pubis bones of the pelvis through which nerves and blood vessels pass.

Structure 
It is bounded by a thin, uneven margin, to which a strong membrane is attached, and presents, superiorly, a deep groove, the obturator groove, which runs from the pelvis obliquely medialward and downward.

This groove is converted into the obturator canal by a ligamentous band, a specialized part of the obturator membrane, attached to two tubercles:
 one, the posterior obturator tubercle, on the medial border of the ischium, just in front of the acetabular notch
 the other, the anterior obturator tubercle, on the obturator crest of the superior ramus of the pubis

Variation 
Reflecting the overall sex differences between male and female pelvises, the obturator foramina are oval in the male and wider and more triangular in the female.

Additionally, unilateral pelvis hypoplasia can cause differences in size between the obturator foramina, and there are even rare reports of individual pelvises featuring a double obturator foramen in one of the hip bones.

Function
Through the canal the obturator artery, obturator vein and obturator nerve pass out of the pelvis.

See also
 Obturator internus muscle
 Obturator externus muscle

Additional images

References

External links
  - "Pelvis & Perineum: Male Urethrogram"
 Photo at vc.cc.tx.us 

Bones of the pelvis